Dorsal nucleus may refer to:

 Dorsal cochlear nucleus, a cortex-like structure on the dorso-lateral surface of the brainstem
 Dorsal nucleus of vagus nerve, a cranial nerve nucleus for the vagus nerve
 Dorsal raphe nucleus
 Lateral dorsal nucleus of thalamus
 Medial dorsal nucleus of thalamus
 Posterior thoracic nucleus (or dorsal nucleus), is a group of interneurons found in the medial part of Lamina VII